This is a list of characters who appear in the Pucca television series.

Main characters

Pucca 
 Voiced by:
 Tabitha St. Germain (English) (2006–2008)
 Maryke Hendrikse (English) (2006–2008)
 Jeonghwa Yang (2018–)

 Age:
 10–11 in Season 1 (11 since "Slam Bam Birthday Bash"), 11–12 in Season 2, 12–13 in Season 3

Pucca is the series' title character. She is an 10-11 year old (12-13 in Season 3) Korean girl who loves Garu. She never talks, most likely in order to imitate Garu, who took a vow of silence. Pucca lives with her uncles, the three Master Chefs at the Gohrong Restaurant. She also delivers noodles from the restaurant on her scooter. Pucca is known all over Sooga Island as the "Kung Fu Chaser", and although she isn't a ninja, Pucca has demonstrated some unique abilities that make up for what she lacks in training. Some of these abilities are a nearly indestructible head, the ability to run on water, and transforming into a Sailor Scout, a Little Mermaid, and a Power Ranger, Pucca also has immense strength. Even though she is typically sweet-natured and cheerful, Pucca can be temperamental when she does not get what she wants. Pucca has very long black hair, but usually wears it in the odango style, accompanied by red scrunchies. She is often referred to as being a goddess of weather as she caused rain clouds and wind to form: either when her uncle and the Master Chefs' feuding got annoying or when Ring Ring pushed her too far by taking Garu from her, causing her to fly away when the winds got too much.

Garu 
 Voiced by:
 Brian Drummond (English) (2006–2008)
 John Stocker (English) (2006–2008)
 Yongwoo Shin (2018–)

 Age:
 12-13 in season 1 (13 since "The Cursed Tie"), 13-14 in season 2 and 14-15 in season 3

Garu is a dedicated ninja in training. As revealed in "Romancing the Clone", he took a vow of silence, which is why he never talks. He will immediately accept a quest if told it will bring him great honor. Like Pucca, Garu is capable of superhuman athletics and endurance. In addition to being a skilled ninja, Garu has also demonstrated the ability to play the erhu. He is very shy and does not display excessive affection towards Pucca in the TV series, but in the episode "And The Band Played Rong" Tobe insulted Pucca and this led to Garu becoming infuriated and attacking him. Pucca and Garu's relationship is more exclusively shown in the original flash series, where they are more officially displayed as a couple. Garu is close friends with both Abyo and Ssoso. Garu has two rivals in the series, including Tobe in almost every episode and Mooji in certain episodes. On top of his hat, Garu loves animals similar to his cat Mio.

The Goh-Rong Restaurant Chefs 
 Voiced by:
 Brian Dobson (Uncle Dumpling, 2006–2008) Kirk Thornton (Uncle Dumpling, 2018–)
 Michael Dobson (Uncle Ho, 2006–2008) Spike Spencer (Uncle Ho, 2018–)
 Dale Wilson (Uncle Linguini, 2006–2008) Steve Canden (Uncle Linguini, 2018–)

Dumpling, Ho, and Linguini are three brothers and Pucca's uncles as well as her guardians. They are also the owners of The Gohrong Restaurant, where Linguini makes noodles, Dumpling cuts them and the other ingredients, and Ho fries it all. They all are named after food - Dumpling after the Dumpling, Ho after the Hoe, and Linguini after the Linguine. Their spectacular dish is the jajangmyeon noodles. They hold their noodles in very high regard, and possess a culinary honor system. In "Chef Slump," it is revealed they are adept in athletics and martial arts (but in a cooking matter). They also once had a common love interest in Kua, an adventurer, though she ended up leaving them for Master Soo. But in "Hot and Bothered", Hoe finally got a girlfriend, a fire goddess named Hottie.

Abyo 
 Voiced by:
 Lee Tockar (English) (2006–2008)
 Doug Erholtz (English) (2018–)

 Age:
 12–13 in Season 1, 13–14 in Season 2, 14–15 in Season 3

Abyo is Garu's best friend. A practitioner of kung-fu, Abyo is very outgoing, competitive, selfish, self-absorbed, confident, and excitable. He believes that he is a Kung-Fu master, and that all the ladies want him (neither of which are true). Ching has a crush on him and often gets jealous when he flirts or looks at girls. Abyo is the son of Bruce, the police chief of Sooga. He is patterned after Bruce Lee.

Ching 
 Voiced by:
 Chantal Strand (English) (2006–2008)
 Melissa Fahn (English) (2018–)

 Age:
 10–11 in Season 1, 11–12 in Season 2, 12–13 in Season 3

Ching is the daughter of Chang, the master of Turtle Training Hall. She is highly skilled in both sword-handling and combat. She is Pucca's best friend. Although she's usually happy-go-lucky, warm, and supportive, she gets mad whenever Abyo flirts with other girls. She also has a magic-egg laying chicken named Won that can often be seen sitting on her head.

Villains

Ring Ring 
 Voiced by: Tabitha St. Germain (2006–2008), Karen Strassman (2018–)
 Age: 12–13 in Season 1, 13–14 in Season 2, 14–15 in Season 3
Ring Ring is Pucca's enemy and rival. She is stylish, but vain and selfish, always wanting to be better and prettier than everyone else. However, no one pays attention to Ring Ring due to seeing her as she truly is. She resents Pucca for being more pretty and stylish than her. Ring Ring is the goddess of the wind, and is possibly from China (explaining her Chinese choice of clothing). When someone makes her angry or upset, she gains the ability to stretch and control her long hair and the sleeves of her dress, and the power to sing in a high octave. She also has a shih-tzu named Yuni. She spends most of her time trying to get attention off of Pucca or to hurt her. However, she occasionally sees the consequences in pushing Pucca too far. Ring Ring is very obsessed with Garu. Most of the time she's trying to beat Pucca, so that Garu will love her, which most of the time utterly fails. She looks Chinese by both physical appearance and attire, and speaks with a voice that sounds like a combination of Betty Boop's voice as a New York City accent type and a Chinese accent.

Tobe 
 Voiced by: Lee Tockar (2006–2008), Ben Pronsky (2018–)
 Age: 14–15 in Season 1, 15–16 in Season 2, 16–17 in Season 3
First appeared in "Oasis". A main villain, Tobe is rarely capable of defeating Garu, much less than Pucca. Tobe is obsessed with trying to strike vengeance on Garu. Tobe has pale, purplish-pinkish skin; an x-shaped marking that appears to be a scar, on the bridge of his nose; and long, black hair in a ponytail revealed when his ninja mask is removed. He is accompanied by his ninja minions who usually eliminate themselves by misinterpreting Tobe's commands or acting stupid. Just like Muji, he has minions.

The Vagabond Ninja Clan 
 Voiced by: Bill Mondy (Clown), Shannon Chan-Kent (Chief), Louis Chirillo (Shaman)
A trio of crooks mostly performing petty crimes. They are Binggure (a clown kicked out of the circus for not being able to laugh), Jumong (a bungling magician), and Jing Jing/Chief (the female boss of the Vagabond Ninja Clan). Jing-Jing is in love with Tobe, and marries him in the episode "Evil Love" because of Cupid's mis-shot arrow. Jing Jing speaks with an East Asian accent, Binggure speaks with a New York City accent with a verbal tic of "Eh" probably because he is a clown, and Jumong speaks with an indistinguishable American accent. Jumong's magic spells often fail or backfire, and Binggure can't entertain well as a clown. Jing Jing is the sole female of the group and is the smartest of the three, but got even smarter in the episode "4 Eyes, 2 Minds". Jing Jing the chief/leader speaks with an East Asian accent in a very high-pitched voice, not dissimilar to Ring Ring vocal-wise of both pitch and accent.

Muji 
 Voiced by: David "Squatch" Ward
Muji is a Hispanic-looking man with a Latino accent, with black, Afro-textured hair; a skin tone to that of either a Latino person or a black person; a mustache that matches his hair in both color and texture; fight-clothing–looking attire in grey; and matching grey gloves. Just like most cartoon men characters with a mustache who pride themselves on their mustaches, he pronounces the word "mustache" as "moo-stash" instead of "muh-stash". Muji nonetheless has an East Asian name despite his looks and accent. His minions are zombies who usually speak in the language called "Zombie", which, of course, is a series of moans and groans; and do occasionally speak English, which most particularly is the word "Brains" like most zombies in fiction say. When he goes outside, Muji usually wears a grey hooded cloak with the hood over his head, especially when he is being secretive or is doing evil schemes. Muji is a passionate lover of his facial hair and combs it in a hand-held mirror more frequently than not. During the "Ping-Pong Pucca" episode, Muji teamed up with fellow villain Tobe to win the ping-pong match against Garu and Abyo. He was once assigned by Ring Ring to sabotage Pucca's party in the episode "Ring Ring's Party Favours" by giving her Chinese demon beetles, to which he failed. (He gave her fireflies instead). Not only is his mustache a part of who he is but also his conscious, telling him to do bad things. Muji is the stereotype of a vain mustached man. Muji's largest fear is a barber due to his mustache. (This was seen in the episode "Astral Boy and Dream Girl"). His minions are grey-skinned, muscular-looking zombies who seem to coincidentally use the word "Brains" as an answer to what seems to be said that moment. (For example, in the special episode "Bride of Muji", when Muji asked what does the Frankenstein-story version of Garu has that he does not, his zombie moaned "Brains"; and in the episode "Striking Out", one of his zombies applies to be one of Tobe's new minions and when Tobe asked the zombie to "tell him a little bit about himself", the zombie replied with a zombie-like, audible moan followed by the term "No brain" in which Tobe thought that the zombie was mocking him by saying that Tobe has no brain). Muji is also known for having a good ping-pong record according to the episode "Ping-Pong Pucca". Just like Tobe, he has minions.

Dong King 
 Voiced by: Michael Sorich
Dong King first appeared in Season 3. He is Ring Ring's father, the boss of Fyah, the CEO of Dong King Restaurant and bitter rival of the Goh Rong chefs. He serves as the ultimate villain of Season 3.

Fyah 
 Voiced by: Steve Canden
He first appeared as a villain on Season 3. He is the minion of Dong King, and is often forced to carry out schemes for Ring Ring. He has a rather simple-minded nephew named Ayo

Minor villains

Cat Clan 
They are rivals to Mio (Garu's cat) and are all in love with Yani (Pucca's cat). Although its never mentioned in the show, their names are, according to the Jetix website: Brutus, Socrates, and Napoleon.

Doga 
 Voiced by: Kathleen Barr
An evil witch with a foul temper, she attacks anyone if they so much as step on her shadow. Doga was known to harbor black magic powers, but were no match for Pucca's light and love energies. She speaks with a New York City accent in a husky voice.

Supporting characters

Santa Claus 
 Voiced by: French Tickner (2006–2008), John Stocker (2006–2008), Spike Spencer (2018–, credited on Finale Credits)
First appeared in a Christmas story, but later began to appear frequently, showing what he does when it's not Christmas. This includes many jobs; such as being a doctor, a taxi driver and a shopkeeper. He is usually an unwitting victim of Pucca when she is after Garu. In one episode, Santa signs up to become a ninja like Garu. Before he became Santa, he was known as a thief called Red Lantern who used to work in pair with a ninja named Black Powder.

Dada 
 Voiced by: Lee Tockar (2006–2008), Todd Haberkorn (2018–)
 Age: 14–15 in Season 1, 15–16 in Season 2, 16–17 in Season 3
Dada is a dishwasher and waiter at the Goh-Rong restaurant. He is usually nervous, high-strung, and clumsy, frequently making accidents in the kitchen. He has a crush on Ring-Ring, until after the way she treated him in the end of "Soap Opera". In "Chef Napped," he helped Ring-Ring kidnap noodle chefs from around the world, including the chefs: Dumpling, Ho and Linguini (as a form of revenge for the way they mistreated him). He and Ring-Ring were both foiled by Garu, Pucca and their friends. Dada once became Ring-Ring's boyfriend in "Soap Opera," thanks to Mister Dishey (a bubble genie). When he was exposed by Pucca to everyone, Ring-Ring was furious and left him. Despite this, she is sympathetic towards him, as he often feels down and is grateful for her kindness. It's also hinted that Dada develops feelings for Pucca since then and doesn't think Garu is right for her. Hence, he teamed up with Ring-Ring again in "He Loves Me Not" to pretend to be Garu and divert his feelings for Ring-Ring. It was his attempt to show Pucca that she was wasting her time chasing after Garu and she should be with him instead. When Garu exposes Dada as the imposter, everyone was shocked. However, Pucca is angry with him for it because his action was a form of betrayal to their friendship.

Destiny 
 Voiced by: Alvin Sanders
Destiny is a golden Chinese-style dragon who lives in a cave behind the waterfall in Sooga Lake. Destiny is a lounge singer and piano player. He and Pucca attempted to plan a romantic date with her and Garu. Garu walked off, but when Destiny said that because he left Pucca crying, he has no honor and he fights him. In the end, Pucca helped him to score his first gig in five hundred years performing at the Goh-Rong. He reappeared in "Chef Napped!" where he flew the gang to Las Vegas for the World of Noodles Convention, and helped to rescue the chefs when they were kidnapped. He also appeared in "Enter the Dragon Girls" as the Dragon Girls' troop leader. He was also seen in "Full Moon Pucca," when Garu was lip-synching, Destiny was behind a fence, doing the real singing. And in "Garu Hood," he ate the last noodle bowl so Garu Hood (aka Robin Hood) had to get it back. Destiny ended up eating Garu, Abyo, and Dada until Pucca beat him. Destiny can fly (though he has no wings), and breathe fire, but in addition, he can make himself grow larger by roaring or singing.

Master Soo 
 Voiced by: Richard Newman
Master Soo means to be the leader or the mayor of the Sooga Village. He always flies on a cloud and he always has a large group of identical-looking handmaidens flanked at his side. Master Soo seems to be the source of all knowledge of the village, and he often acts as a guide to people in need, similar to how Ching's father, Chang, seems to be a teacher. Master Soo is bald, has a dark beard, and is almost always animated with his eyes looking closed except on rare occasions. He also appears to have freckles under his closed eyes. He seems to be arrogant and braggadocious, with examples being the episodes "Datin’ and Dumplins," "Tomb It May Concern", "Knock It Off!," "And The Band Played Rong," and so on. Master Soo was the beauty-pageant host in the Sooga beauty pageant called "Little Miss Sooga," where his identical handmaidens were also contestants in said pageant. He also hosted the ping pong match in the episode "Ping Pong Pucca". Master Soo is said to be hundreds of years old, most particularly himself. He is the old, wise being of Sooga Village, and he seems to be in charge of the entire village especially according to the episode: "Knock It Off!". He may seem kind at first, but he can also be mischievous, especially according to the episode "The Choo-Choo Trouble", where he pranks his younger brother who seems to be the leader of his own village named Master Loo. When he pranks his younger brother named Master Loo, who seems to be the leader of his own village, it is a cookie-jar-looking container filled with rubber snakes, which is intended to be a birthday prank on him. He is, however, nonetheless the main teacher of the entire village.

Ssoso 
 Voiced by: Kathleen Barr (2006–2008), and Tony Azzolino (2018–)
A young Buddhist monk who is very calm and collected, often speaking in proverbs and wise sayings, but also has terrible eyesight. He practiced martial arts many years in a Shaolin temple, but left there to seek better martial art skills. He is a rival to Abyo.

Mio 
Garu's beloved black cat. It is said the time can be told by looking at Mio's eyes. He seems capable of performing a feline form of martial arts and is in love with Yani (Pucca's cat). He also hates to go to the vet's office to get a shot. Mio only went there because Yani was there as a moral support.

Won 
Ching's pet chicken who is often seen on the top of her head. She is known to lay powerful eggs which lead Tobe to try and capture Won with failed results.

Yani 
Pucca's pink cat, Yani is the most popular cat in Sooga village. She always gives the paw, being a snob cat. She is loved by Mio and the Cat Clan, who are Mio's rivals. Yani is in love with Mio and doesn't like the Cat Clan.

Yuni 
Ring-Ring's pet shih tzu. She is considered to be Yani's rival. Yuni can either be seen being an accomplice to Ring-Ring in trying to one up Pucca or trying to stop her. The latter was evident in "Ring-Ring's Party Favors" when she was carrying an envelope (with an invitation to Ring-Ring for Pucca's party). Yuni was scolded by Ring-Ring in "Little Miss Sooga" for getting the silkworms and making Pucca's dress look better than hers.

Minor characters

Policeman Bruce 
 Voiced by: Dale Wilson (2006–2008), Kirk Thornton (2018–, credited on Finale Credits)
Abyo's father, he usually chases after Abyo when he is being 'antisocial' (or destructive). His wife is never seen or mentioned. He usually says "Over" after nearly everything he says, as if he were talking in police parlance.

Chang 
 Voiced by: Michael Daingerfield (2006–2008), Todd Haberkorn (2018–)
Chang is Ching's father. He is the master of Turtle Training Hall and teaches Ching, Garu, Ssoso and Abyo martial arts. His best friend is Policeman Bruce.

Goblins (Smiley Men) 
Common civilians. They are paper-like creatures. Their gender is determined by their color - blue being male, and pink being female. These smiley people can also build things fairly quickly. They are usually seen everywhere in Sooga village. They are also useful in helping others. They have special abilities as well such as control over fire or water, and can also combine to form one giant smiley man if their emotions run high, such as if they were angry.

References 

Lists of characters in South Korean television animation
Martial artist characters in television